The 2012–13 Niagara Purple Eagles men's basketball team represented Niagara University during the 2012–13 NCAA Division I men's basketball season. The Purple Eagles, led by 14th year head coach Joe Mihalich, played their home games at the Gallagher Center and were members of the Metro Atlantic Athletic Conference. They finished the season 19–14, 13–5 in MAAC play win the regular season conference championship. They advanced to the semifinals of the MAAC tournament where they lost to Iona. As a regular season conference champion who failed to win their conference tournament, they received an automatic bid to the 2013 NIT where they lost in the first round to Maryland.

Roster

Schedule

|-
!colspan=9| Regular season

|-
!colspan=9| 2013 MAAC tournament

|-
!colspan=9| 2013 NIT

References

Niagara Purple Eagles men's basketball seasons
Niagara
Niagara
Niagara Purple Eagles men's basketball
Niagara Purple Eagles men's basketball